"Nice Boys" is the third single from Amy Studt's album My Paper Made Men, due to be released on 1 March 2009. This was the first single from the album to be released in a physical format, and a CD edition of the album was due out around the same time.

Remixes by Wawa and Soha & Adam K were released digitally in late 2008, at least one of which has been played and was a favourite on the club scene.

Track list
 Nice Boys (radio edit) 03:32
 Nice Boys (Wawa radio edit) 02:56
 Nice Boys (Wawa remix) 07:20
 Nice Boys (Wawa remix edit) 07:05
 Nice Boys (Soha & Adam K remix) 06:03
 Nice Boys (Soha & Adam K dub ) 06:03
 Nice Boys (instrumental) 03:30

Music video
The video was directed by Paul Minor and shot at Finsbury Old Town Hall in London. It featured her surrounded by five boys, presumably they are the "Nice boys" that Studt is singing about.

In other media
"Nice Boys" has been played several times in UK soap EastEnders as background radio music.

References

External links
 Review
 Video on YouTube
 Behind the scenes video on YouTube

2009 singles
Amy Studt songs
2008 songs
19 Recordings singles
Songs written by Amy Studt